Jaghatu is a major tribe of Hazara people in Afghanistan, who mostly from Jaghatu District of Ghazni Province.

Etymology 
The name Jaghatu is derived from the Turkic word of Jagatai or Jaghatai.

See also 
 Jaghatu District
 List of Hazara tribes

References 

Hazara tribes
Hazara people